The slaty bunting (Emberiza siemsseni) is a species of bird in the family Emberizidae.

Appearance
An adult Slaty bunting measures 13 centimeters in length and weighs 20 grams. The plumages are brown and highly distinctive with unusual tail feathers which are broad towards the tip. Its bill is comparatively small and neat.

Range
It is endemic to China.

Habitat 
Its natural habitat is subtropical or tropical moist shrubland.

Diet
Slaty bunting's diet includes seeds, insects, and other small invertebrates.

Conservation status
The population of Slaty bunting is not globally threatened. However, migration and clearing of vegetation for agriculture are some of the threats facing this species in China.

References

 Misachi, John. “Bird Species Native to China.” WorldAtlas, 31 Oct. 2016, https://www.worldatlas.com/articles/the-native-birds-of-china.html.

Emberiza
Birds of China
Endemic birds of China
slaty bunting
Taxonomy articles created by Polbot